Catherine Tofts or Katherine Tofts (died 1756) was the first English singer who sang Italian opera in England.

Life
About 1704, the competition between Tofts and Margherita de l'Épine was in earnest. Perhaps to illustrate the famed rivalry, Marco Ricci painted L'Épine with her back to Tofts, in the composition Rehearsal of an opera (c.1709) .

Jonathon Swift has a short poem about Mrs Tofts in his "works" which talks of her beauty. It is thought however that the verse was written by Alexander Pope.

Tofts quit the stage in 1709 and married Joseph Smith, English consul at Venice. They had a son but he died as when still a child and Catherine became mentally ill. She died in 1756 and her husband married again the following year.

References

See also 
 Margherita de l'Épine

English operatic sopranos
1756 deaths
18th-century British women opera singers
Year of birth missing